Ben Tu'umoe Paul Afeaki (born 12 January 1988) is a former New Zealand rugby union footballer. His regular playing position was prop.

Afeaki made his lone test appearance on 8 June 2013, replacing Wyatt Crockett with five minutes left during a 23–13 victory over France.

He retired in April 2015, aged 27, after failing to recover from a concussion sustained during the 2014 Super Rugby season.

It was announced in 2017 that Afeaki would become the Blues' Scrum Coach for the 2018 season. Afeaki claimed he was still suffering concussion symptoms at the time.

References

External links
 All Blacks Bio 
 Chiefs profile
 North Harbour
 Yahoo NZ profile
 itsrugby.co.uk profile
 

Living people
1988 births
New Zealand international rugby union players
Chiefs (rugby union) players
Rugby union props
New Zealand sportspeople of Tongan descent
North Harbour rugby union players
Rugby union players from Auckland
People educated at Sacred Heart College, Auckland